"Haywire" is the 18th television play episode of the first season of the Australian anthology television series Australian Playhouse. "Haywire" was written by Creswick Jenkinson and directed by Pat Alexander and originally aired on ABC on 15 August 1966.

Plot
A young art student is followed home by Roscoe, a male model. She is scolded by her sister Joya who believes she can deal with Roscoe but gets trapped by him. She accidentally calls two uni students who are unsure if they are hearing a real call or a radio drama. They eventually decide to find the girl but have trouble locating her.

Cast
 Kit Taylor as uni student
 John Krummel as uni student
 Carolyn Keely as Joya, her elder sister
 Lucia Duchenski as the art student
 David Yorston as Roscoe

Production
It was filmed in Sydney, New South Wales

Reception
The Age called it "ranting melodrama, over obvious and with incident reduced to a minimum."

See also
 List of television plays broadcast on Australian Broadcasting Corporation (1960s)

References

External links
 
 
 

1966 television plays
1966 Australian television episodes
1960s Australian television plays
Australian Playhouse (season 1) episodes